Paul F. Whelan is Professor of Computer Vision at the Centre for Image Processing & Analysis, School of Electronic Engineering, Faculty of Engineering & Computing Dublin City University.

Education and career
Whelan earned his Bachelor of Engineering with First Class Honours from the National Institute for Higher Education before enrolling in the University of Limerick for his Master of Engineering degree. After receiving his PhD in Computing Mathematics/Computer Vision from Cardiff University, Whelan joined the Industrial and Scientific Imaging Ltd to research and develop an industrial vision system.

Selected publications
 Machine Vision Algorithms in Java: Techniques and Implementation, Springer (reprinted Aug. 2001), 2000.
 Intelligent Vision Systems for Industry, Springer-Verlag, 1997.

References

External links

Year of birth missing (living people)
Living people
Irish engineers
Irish computer scientists
Academics of Dublin City University
Alumni of Dublin City University
Alumni of Cardiff University
Alumni of the University of Limerick